Pandit Taba Ram Turki (1776 – 1847 CE, 1833 – 1904 Vikram Samvat) lived at Rainawari, Srinagar and wrote Persian poetry under the pen name (takhalus) of Betab. Betab made an important contribution to the Persian poetry and he commanded great respect among the poets of Kashmir of his time. Betab was an exceptional poet whose Persian poetry reached as far as Central Asia. Some critics have rated Betab's works at par with the Shahnama of Firdausi. Betab was also proficient with reading and writing Arabic.

Mulla Mohammad Taufiq Kashmiri, another popular Persian poet of the era who lived near Jama Masjid area of Srinagar and wrote under takhalus Taufiq was a contemporary of Betab. Betab was a frequent visitor to the Court (Durbar) of Pandit Raja Kak Dar, who was also a gifted poet and wrote under takhalus Farukh.

Betab's comprehensive collection (Diwan) of poems was first published fourteen (14) years after his death in 1861 CE.

 in Kashmiri language Taba is a short name for Aftab (meaning Sun in Persian)

Origin 
Betab's ancestors originally hailed from village Turkipora in Rajwar Tehsil of Kupwara district. This village was named Vishnupora prior to 1305 CE, when the Tatar Zulkadar Khan - commonly named Zulzu invaded Kashmir, massacred huge population nearly depopulating the Valley, set fire to the city of Srinagar and took 50,000 slaves comprising men, women and children. Betab's ancestors challenged Zulzu's forces to fight in place of surrender. In the ensuing battle with the Tatars - Turkis for locals as they came from Turkmenistan, Betab's brave ancestors were killed after which local populace started calling the surviving clan Turki with the village itself getting renamed to Turkipora since.

Betab's ancestors relocated to Srinagar during the reign of Budshah. In the next few hundred years, Betab's ancestors moved around to live at various localities of Srinagar before settling at Motiyar Rainawari.

Occupation 
After completing his education Betab was appointed as an administrative official (Kardar) at village Breng in Anantnag area of the valley, where he spent most of his service life.

Compositions 

Betab composed his writings in the form of masnawis which contain historical details of his times (a masnawi is a long epic poem describing the battles fought and past events and may also include philosophical or ethical themes).

Betab was summoned to Kabul and honoured by the general and wazir of Afghanistan Prince Mohammad Akbar Khan. Betab praised his patron Mohammad Akbar Khan in the poem Akbar-nama. Akbar Khan was a great lover of fine Arts.

Betab then witnessed the invasion of the Sikh army of Maharaja Ranjit Singh over his native land Kashmir and the defeat of the Afghan governor Muhammad Azim Khan in 1819 CE, which he versified under the title Jang-nama.

After the change of rulers, Betab visited Lahore for a meeting with Maharaja Ranjit Singh. Betab was honoured by Maharaja Ranjit Singh in his Durbar, where he also met the powerful and influential Raja Dina Nath, who was Finance Minister of Maharaja Ranjit Singh. Following his return from Lahore, Betab composed one more masnawi containing historical details like the other two named Ranjit-nama.

Style 
On one occasion someone recited Taufiq's verse (sher) - shikasta rangiye man ba tabeeb dar jung ast /ilaje darde saram husne sandali rang ast (authentic English translation ????), which was applauded by all present in the gathering. Pandit Raja Kak Dhar who was present in the gathering threw a challenge - could anyone compose a better sher in the same style and manner? Betab accepted the challenge on the condition that he should be suitably rewarded and produced a master piece in the process - siyah bakhtam wa az bakhte khaesh khursandam /chara ki bakhte man wa zulfe yar hum rang ast (authentic English translation ????).

Pandit Raja Kak Dhar immediately ordered his men to deliver one hundred Kharwars (legacy measure of weight in Kashmir; 1 Kharwar = 177 Pounds or about 80 kg) of paddy at Betab's residence.

Reviews 

J.K. Banerji in the book Encyclopaedia of Kashmir mentions "Outstanding among the Hindu Pandits who made important contributions to Persian poetry may be mentioned the name of Pandit Taba Ram Turki "Betab" whose Jang Nama reached classic heights."

Further eminent historian and author Pandit Gwasha Lal Kaul in the same book Encyclopaedia of Kashmir mentions "Jangnama by Taba Ram Turki stands on the same footing as Shahnama of Firdausi".

Betab's Masnawis are prescribed for Post Graduation studies in the University of Tehran (needs authentication).

References

External links 
 Bhat, Dr. Khursheed Ahmad.  "Cultural Conditions of Kashmir during 20th Century" Retrieved 2018-04-07.
 Iqbal Ahmad.  "The Less Known Persian Manuscripts" Retrieved 2018-10-31.
 Kaul, Brigadier Rattan.  "Saraswat Brahmins" Retrieved 2018-04-07.
 Kilam, Jia Lal.  "A History of Kashmiri Pandits" Retrieved 2018-04-07.
 Kilam, Jia Lal.  "A Survey of Afghan Rule in Kashmir" Retrieved 2018-04-07.
Turkipora [6] Retrieved 2018-10-31.

1776 births
1847 deaths
Persian-language poets
Kashmiri people